The Uí Dúnlainge, from the Old Irish "grandsons (or descendants) of Dúnlaing", were an Irish dynasty of Leinster kings who traced their descent from Dúnlaing mac Énda Niada a fifth century King of Leinster. He was said to be a cousin of Énnae Cennsalach, eponymous ancestor of the rival Uí Chennselaig.

Their claims to the kingship of Leinster were unopposed after the death of Áed mac Colggen in the Battle of Ballyshannon on the 19th August 738AD. Three of the sons of Murchad mac Brain (d. 727), Dunchad, Faelan, and Muiredach reigned in turn after him as kings of Leinster. These kings were progenitors of the most powerful branches of Ui Dunlainge in the following three centuries: Ui Dunchada, Ui Faelain, and Ui Muiredaig. These three kindreds rotated the kingship of Leinster between them from 750AD to 1050AD. This is unusual in early Irish history as it was the equivalent of "keeping three oranges in the air" (the east Ulster kingdom of Ulaid also rotated the kingship between families). Fourteen Uí Muiredaig kings (from whom descend the O'Toole family) were based at Mullaghmast/Máistín. Nine Uí Faelain kings (from whom descend the O'Byrne family) were based at Naas/Nás na Ríogh and ten Uí Dúnchada kings (later known as the MacGillaMo-Cholmoc and, after the Norman invasion, renamed the FitzDermots) were based at Lyons Hill/ Líamhain nearest to Dublin city. By the end of this remarkable run, the kingship of Leinster was being rotated between 7th cousins. 

The Fitzdermots later gave their names to the placenames Dolphin's Barn and Ballyfermot. 

The influence of the Uí Dúnlainge family helped secure place-myths for prominent Kildare landmarks in the heroic and romantic literature such as the Dindseanchas, Dinnshenchas Érenn as one of the "assemblies and noted places in Ireland". 

After the death of the last Kildare-based King of Laighin, Murchad Mac Dunlainge in 1042, the Kingship of Leinster reverted to the Uí Cheinnselaig kindred based in the south east of Leinster.

See also
 Laigin
 Irish nobility
 Irish royal families

References

Further reading

O'Brien, Michael A. "A Middle Irish poem on the Christian kings of Leinster." Ériu 17 (1955). pp. 35–51.

Kings of Leinster
History of County Kildare
Laigin
Gaelic-Irish nations and dynasties
Gaels